The Ménard River is a tributary of the Wawagosic River, flowing into the municipality of Eeyou Istchee James Bay (municipality), in the administrative region of Nord-du-Québec, in Quebec, in Canada. The course of the Ménard River crosses successively the cantons of Lemaire and Brabazon.

Forestry is the main economic activity of the sector; recreational tourism activities, second. The area is served by some secondary forest roads.

The surface of the river is usually frozen from the end of November to the end of April, however safe ice circulation is generally from early December to mid-April.

Geography 
The surrounding hydrographic slopes of the Ménard River are:
Northside: Wawagosic River, Turgeon River, Obakamigacici Creek, Kadabakato River;
East side: Partridge River, Angle River, Harricana River;
South side: Turgeon Lake, Kadabakato River, Wawagosic River;
West side: Boivin River, Orfroy Creek, Hal Creek, Patten River.

The Ménard River rises at the mouth of a Jos-Doire Lake (length: ,) in the Lemaire Township which is surrounded of marsh areas. This lake is located at:
 North-East of the village center of Villebois, Quebec;
 South of the mouth of the Ménard River (confluence with the Wawagosic River);
 East of the border Ontario-Quebec;
 southeast of the mouth of the Wawagosic River (confluence with Turgeon River).

From its source, the "Menard River" flows over  entirely in forest zone according to these segments:
 northwesterly in Lemaire township, to a creek (from the southwest);
 northwesterly to the southerly limit of Brabazon township;
 in Brabazon Township northward, then northeastward, forming numerous small streamers, up to a creek (from the west);
 northerly snaking to a creek (coming from the northwest);
 North-East winding up at the beginning of the segment, to its mouth.

The mouth of the "Menard River" which flows on the southwest shore of the Wawagosic River is located in the forest zone at:
 Southeast of the mouth of the Wawagosic River (confluence with Turgeon River);
 East of the border Ontario - Quebec;
 South of the mouth of the Turgeon River (confluence with the Harricana River);
 southwest of the village center of Joutel.

Toponymy 
The term "Ménard" is a family name of French origin.

The toponym "Ménard River" was formalized on December 5, 1968, at the Commission de toponymie du Québec, at the creation of this commission.

Notes and references

See also 

Wawagosic River, a watercourse
Turgeon River, a watercourse
Harricana River, a watercourse
James Bay
James Bay
Eeyou Istchee Baie-James (municipality), a municipality
List of rivers of Quebec

Ménard